Juho Haapoja (born 22 October 1980) is a Finnish former professional boxer who competed from 2006 to 2017, and held the European Union cruiserweight title twice between 2011 and 2017.

Professional career
Haapoja made his professional debut on 8 April 2006, losing a four-round points decision to Remigijus Ziausys, who also debuted. A ten-round split draw against Jari Markkanen on 16 March 2007 denied Haapoja a chance to win the Finnish heavyweight title. He lost for a second time to Denis Bakhtov on 22 May 2008, which was for a WBC and PABA regional heavyweight title. On 28 November 2008, Haapoja stopped Sami Elovaara in nine rounds to become the Finnish heavyweight champion, winning the vacant title in his second attempt. A defence of this title against Jarno Rosberg, which went the ten-round distance, was later relegated to a no contest after Rosberg was caught for steroids.

On 23 September 2011, Haapoja won his first major regional title by defeating Faisal Ibnel Arrami via unanimous decision (UD) to become the European Union cruiserweight champion. He made two successful defences against Ian Tims on 21 January 2012 (twelve-round unanimous decision) and Francesco Versaci on 15 September 2012 (fourth-round stoppage), but lost the title to Mateusz Masternak on 15 December 2012 (unanimous decision). Consecutive losses came against Silvio Branco on 6 July 2013 (tenth-round technical decision) and Rakhim Chakhkiyev on 15 March 2014 (ninth-round TKO), both times for the vacant WBC Silver cruiserweight title.

Haapoja suffered his sixth professional loss on 31 January 2015, when he was stopped in two rounds by Serhiy Demchenko. In a rematch against Demchenko on 23 May, the fight ended in a ten-round split draw. Haapoja won his second European Union cruiserweight title on 25 March 2017, scoring a UD over Damian Bruzzese. His first defence, on 21 October, was unsuccessful: after losing an SD to Alexandru Jur, Haapoja promptly announced his retirement from boxing.

Professional boxing record

References

External links
Official website  (archived)

Finnish male boxers
Heavyweight boxers
Cruiserweight boxers
1980 births
People from Ylihärmä
Living people
Sportspeople from South Ostrobothnia